Leonard Poulter Leary  (24 March 1891 – 11 April 1990) was a New Zealand lawyer and writer. He was born in Palmerston North, New Zealand, on 24 March 1891.

In the 1973 New Year Honours, Leary was appointed a Companion of the Order of St Michael and St George, for services to the law.

References

1891 births
1990 deaths
20th-century New Zealand lawyers
New Zealand writers
People from Palmerston North
New Zealand King's Counsel